The Lamar Life Building is a historic building in Jackson, Mississippi, USA. It was designed in the Gothic Revival architectural style, and it was completed in 1924. It is the twelfth tallest building in Jackson, and was considered Jackson's first skyscraper. The architects were Sanguinet, Staats & Hedrick of Fort Worth, Texas in association with Jackson architect Noah Webster Overstreet.

The building is across the street from the Governor's Mansion and underwent renovations in 2018.

References

Commercial buildings completed in 1924
Gothic Revival architecture in Mississippi
Skyscraper office buildings in Jackson, Mississippi